Henry David Leonard George Walston, Baron Walston CVO, JP (16 June 1912 – 29 May 1991) was a British farmer, agricultural researcher and politician, firstly for the Liberal Party, then for Labour and then for the Social Democratic Party.

Life

Walston was born in 1912 to Sir Charles Waldstein (later Walston) and his wife Florence (née Einstein), and was educated at Eton College and King's College, Cambridge. He was a landowner with estates in Cambridgeshire (2700 acres) and St Lucia (3000 acres).

Walston was appointed a Commander of the Royal Victorian Order (CVO) in 1976 New Year Honours. He was a Deputy chairman and then Vice-President of the Royal Commonwealth Society, which he addressed in 1963; and Governor of Guy's Hospital.

Family

Walston married Catherine Crompton (1916–1978) in 1935, in the USA. Oliver Walston, a farmer and agricultural writer, is their second son. From 1946 Catherine was the  mistress of the author Graham Greene, who was also her godfather. Walston demanded that the adulterous relationship should cease after the 1951 publication of The End of the Affair, Greene's roman à clef; but it continued, ending by about 1966. After Catherine's death, Walston married Elizabeth Scott, who had previously been the wife of Nicholas Scott.

Press reports that Betty Boothroyd, who acted as Walston's secretary before herself entering politics, had been his mistress and also cared for his six children by Catherine, were the subject of a successful libel case brought by Boothroyd.

In politics

Walston served as Member of the Huntingdonshire War Agricultural Committee (1939–1945), Director of Agriculture for the British Zone of Germany (1946–1947), Counsellor of the Duchy of Lancaster (1948–1950), Agricultural Adviser for Germany to the Foreign Office (1964–1967) and Chairman of the Institute of Race Relations (1968–1971).

In the early 1940s he was selected as Liberal prospective parliamentary candidate for King's Lynn. In 1945 his booklet 'From Forces to Farming' was published by the Liberal Party. The booklet called for state aided co-operative farming for ex-servicemen. He did not contest King's Lynn, instead switching to contest Huntingdonshire later that year at the general election.

He never managed to become a member of parliament despite contesting seats five times: Huntingdonshire in 1945 for the Liberals, Cambridgeshire in 1951 and 1955 for Labour, and Gainsborough in the 1956 by-election and in 1959 for Labour. On 10 February 1961 he was created a life peer as Baron Walston, of Newton in the County of Cambridge. He supported the Campaign for Democratic Socialism.

Junior minister

Walston served in the First Wilson ministry, as Under-Secretary of State for Foreign Affairs from 20 October 1964 to the beginning of 1967.

In internal Foreign Office discussion, Walston supported James Cable's line, that the USA should cut its losses in the Vietnam War, and argued that the UK should have a pro-active policy of seeking peace. By the second half of 1965 Walston was in fact pushing this line harder than Cable himself. In June 1966 Walston was passing through South Vietnam on an envoy mission, when he was contacted by Janusz Lewandowski, who said he was acting for the Polish government and attempting to find peace in the Vietnam War. Walston, however, treated this as a freelance approach.

Following Rhodesia's Unilateral Declaration of Independence (UDI) Walston was envoy to Portugal, attempting to negotiate an end to sanction-breaking pumping of oil to Southern Rhodesia via Beira, Mozambique. His diplomacy was overtaken by Security Council resolution 221 of 9 April 1966. As a Foreign Office junior minister, Walston argued that the UK government should not grant Rhodesian independence except on terms of majority rule. While Rhodesia was the responsibility of the Commonwealth Relations Office, he maintained that UDI had increased the chances of communist penetration in Africa and that this was a proper concern of the Foreign Office.

During this time at the Foreign Office, Walston was a trustee of one of John Collins's secret Christian Action trusts, channelling funds to the African National Congress. He expressed very positive feelings about Fidel Castro. Walston was then Parliamentary Secretary to the Board of Trade, in 1967.

Later political life

On a lecture tour of South Africa in 1968, Walston had private discussions with B. J. Vorster, and as a consequence attempted to open a channel of communication to Kenneth Kaunda. He also visited Nelson Mandela on Robben Island, concluding that the prisoner Mandela was being well treated. At this period the South African government wished to broker a deal between the UK and Ian Smith, and to use Walston's contacts.

Walston was a member of the Council of Europe between 1970 and 1975, and a Member of the European Parliament from 1975 to 1977. In the period from 1970 to 1976 Labour politicians met in his apartment in The Albany, forming a retrospectively-christened "Walston group" of pro-European MPs. Walston joined the Social Democratic Party in 1981. During the eighties, Walston became active with the UN accredited non-governmental organisation Agri-Energy Roundtable and served as vice chairman for several years.

Pamphlets

Walston published political pamphlets on agricultural topics:

From Forces to Farming. A Plan for the Ex-Service Man (1944), Liberal Party Publication Department; as prospective Liberal Party candidate for King's Lynn.
Land Nationalisation: For and Against (1958), Fabian Society Issue 312. With John Mackie.
The Farmer and Europe (1962), Fabian Society. On planning for farming if the UK joined the Common Market.
Agriculture under Communism (1962).
Farm Gate to Brussels (1970), Fabian Society.
Dealing with Hunger (1976).

Arms

See also
 Vivien Greene

References

Notes

External links
 

1912 births
1991 deaths
Politicians from London
People from Cambridgeshire
British Ashkenazi Jews
English people of Jewish descent
English people of American descent
People educated at Eton College
Alumni of King's College, Cambridge
English farmers
English landowners
Jewish British politicians
Liberal Party (UK) parliamentary candidates
Social Democratic Party (UK) politicians
Labour Party (UK) MEPs
MEPs for the United Kingdom 1973–1979
Labour Party (UK) life peers
Social Democratic Party (UK) life peers
Parliamentary Under-Secretaries of State for Foreign Affairs
Parliamentary Secretaries to the Board of Trade
Commanders of the Royal Victorian Order
Henry Walston,Baron Walston
Ministers in the Wilson governments, 1964–1970
Life peers created by Elizabeth II